Gagi Fortress (also known as Aghjakala) is an 11th-century historic fortress in Marneuli Municipality, Kvemo Kartli, Georgia.

Castles and forts in Georgia (country)
Buildings and structures in Kvemo Kartli